was a district located in Tokushima Prefecture, Japan.

As of 2003, the district had an estimated population of 46,231 and a density of 320.63 persons per km2.

Towns and villages
 Kamojima
 Kawashima
 Misato
 Yamakawa

Merger
 On October 1, 2004 - the towns of Kamojima, Kawashima and Yamakawa, and the village of Misato were merged to create the city of Yoshinogawa. Therefore, Oe District was dissolved as a result of this merger.

Former districts of Tokushima Prefecture
Yoshinogawa, Tokushima